Andrzej Stefanek (born 16 June 1972) is a Polish modern pentathlete. He competed in the men's individual event at the 2004 Summer Olympics.

References

1972 births
Living people
Polish male modern pentathletes
Olympic modern pentathletes of Poland
Modern pentathletes at the 2004 Summer Olympics
People from Zielona Góra